Turkmenistan participated tn the 2010 Asian Para Games–First Asian Para Games in Guangzhou, China from 13 to 19 December 2010. Athletes from Turkmenistan achieved two bronze medals and finished 29th on the medal table.

References

Nations at the 2010 Asian Para Games
2010 in Turkmenistani sport
Turkmenistan at the Asian Para Games